Ennedi Est was a department of the former Borkou-Ennedi-Tibesti region in Chad. Its capital was Bahaï.

In 2008, the former Ennedi Est and Ennedi Ouest departments of Borkou-Ennedi-Tibesti became the new Ennedi Region. The city of Bahaï is now located in the new Wadi Hawar department of the Ennedi region.

References 

Former departments of Chad
Ennedi-Est Region